Sipocot station is a railway station located on the South Main Line in Camarines Sur, Philippines. It is still used for the Bicol Express and Isarog Limited.

Philippine National Railways stations
Railway stations in Camarines Sur